Printing and Numerical Registering Co v Sampson (1875) 19 Eq 462 is an English contract law and patent case. It is most notable for strong advocacy of the principle of freedom of contract put forward by Sir George Jessel MR. The strict principles expressed were mostly abandoned over the 20th century, as summarised by Lord Denning MR in George Mitchell (Chesterhall) Ltd v Finney Lock Seeds Ltd.

Facts
The Printing and Numerical Registering Co sued Sampson for breaching a patent agreement. Sampson and other shareholders in the company had made a contract to sell "all future patent rights" to the company. Sampson began using the information covered by the patent in his own business. The company sued. Sampson argued his agreement should be void and be considered as being contrary to public policy because it lasted for so long.

Judgment
Sir George Jessel MR held that the contract was valid and remarked,

See also

English contract law

Notes

References

English trusts case law
Court of Appeal (England and Wales) cases
1875 in British law
1875 in case law